Erika von Brockdorff (née Schönfeldt) (29 April 1911 – 13 May 1943) was a German resistance fighter against the Nazi régime during the Second World War. Brockdorff was a member of what the Reich Security Main Office termed the Red Orchestra resistance movement.

Brockdorff was born in Kolberg (Kołobrzeg), Province of Pomerania, on Pomerania's Baltic Sea coast. Her father worked for the post office.   From 1929, after finishing middle school and housekeeping school in Magdeburg, she worked in Berlin as a housekeeper and a model, and also, after additional training in shorthand typing, as an office specialist. In 1937, she married the sculptor Graf Cay–Hugo von Brockdorff, and shortly thereafter, their daughter Saskia was born.

From 1941, Brockdorff put her flat at Hans Coppi's resistance movement's disposal as their radio headquarters (she was having an affair with Coppi at the time). She was soon arrested along with the other Red Orchestra members and sent to Charlottenburg Women's Prison. She was sentenced at the Reichskriegsgericht to ten years in labour prison (Zuchthaus) in January 1943. Adolf Hitler was not satisfied with this, however, and on the very same day as the judgment, on his orders, the sentence was changed to death. Together with Mildred Harnack, she waited another four months for the sentence to be carried out; her colleague Elfriede Paul was one of the few who escaped the death sentence. On the evening of 13 May 1943, she was put to death, by guillotine, along with thirteen other persons at Plötzensee Prison in Berlin.

Sources

External links

1911 births
1943 deaths
People from Kołobrzeg
Executed communists in the German Resistance
Red Orchestra (espionage)
People from the Province of Pomerania
Executed German women
German people executed by Nazi Germany
German spies for the Soviet Union
German countesses
People executed by hanging at Plötzensee Prison